Dumitru Postovan is a Moldovan politician. He was the first General Prosecutor of Moldova (1990–1998).

Biography 
He served as member of the Parliament of Moldova, representing Criuleni District. There was another MP with the same name and surname, representing Drochia District.

External links 
 Cine au fost şi ce fac deputaţii primului Parlament din R. Moldova (1990-1994)?
 Declaraţia deputaţilor din primul Parlament
 Site-ul Parlamentului Republicii Moldova

References

Living people
Moldovan MPs 1990–1994
Popular Front of Moldova MPs
Year of birth missing (living people)